The  is the national governing body for the sport of athletics in Japan.

Presidents
Ryōzō Hiranuma (1929–1958)
Hiroshi Kasuga (1958–1964)
Ichirō Kōno (1965)
Kenzō Kōno (1965–1975)
Hanji Aoki (1975–1999)
Yōhei Kōno (1999–2013)
Hiroshi Yokokawa (2013–)

Kit suppliers
Japan's kits are currently supplied by Asics.

Competitions
IAAF World Athletics Tour Osaka Meeting
Japan Championships in Athletics
National High School Championships in Athletics
National High School Ekiden
Japan Junior Championships in Athletics
Tokyo Marathon
Yokohama Women's Marathon
Nagoya International Women's Marathon
Osaka International Women's Marathon
Fukuoka International Marathon Championship
Biwako Mainichi Marathon
International Chiba Ekiden
Fukuoka International Cross Country Meet
Chiba International Cross Country Championships

See also
1991 World Championships in Athletics
2007 World Championships in Athletics
2006 IAAF World Cross Country Championships
1999 IAAF World Indoor Championships

External links
 

Japan
Federation
Athletics Federations
National governing bodies for athletics
Sports organizations established in 1925